The 3rd Trampoline World Championships were held in Lafayette, Louisiana, United States from April 29 to April 30, 1966.

Results

Men

Trampoline

Trampoline Synchro

Tumbling

Women

Trampoline

Trampoline Synchro

Tumbling

References
 Trampoline UK

Trampoline World Championships
Trampoline Gymnastics World Championships
Trampoline World Championships
1966 in American sports